Anfisa Maksimovna Ageeva, also Anfisa/Anfissa Agejeva/Ageyeva (née Zakharova (Russian: Захарова); born February 12, 1952, in Kanyovka, Murmansk, Soviet Union) is a Kildin Sámi author, translator, musician, and activist. In 2001, she was the first Sámi person from Russia to participate in the Sámi Grand Prix and the first to win it.

Early life
Anfisa Maksimovna Zakharova was born on February 12, 1952 in Kanyovk. Her parents were reindeer herders and decorated war veterans. Her father was Maksim Antonovich Zakharov (1919–1984) and her mother Mariya Ivanovna Zakharova (1922–2008). Together they went on to have a total of 9 children.

In 1962, the Soviet Union decided to build the Serebryanskaya hydroelectric power station near where they lived. To do this, they had to dam the Koarrdõgk River. A few years later, when the entire village of Koarrdõgk was going to be flooded and submerged under the new reservoir, the family were moved to Lovozero.

Music
The traditional vocal music of the Kildin Sámi called luvvt or livvt ( or лыввьт) has been a part of Ageeva's life since she was born. Both Ageeva's mother and grandmother sang luvvts and her mother was a famous singer of them. Her mother sang these with music groups like Lujavvr and Ojar. Some of her luvvts have been recorded; these are archived in Norway, Estonia, Germany, etc. Ageeva's sister, Domna Khomyuk, is also well known for her luvvt singing.

Over the years, Ageeva has performd luvvts many times in the yoik category of the Sámi Grand Prix both alone and with her sister Domna Khomyuk. In 2001, Agejeva entered the contest for the first time with a luvvt called Meleš, which she placed first in the yoik category A couple of years later, she entered again in the same category, but this time with her sister Domna Khomyuk. Their luvvt was called Duottar. Ageeva tried to win the yoik category again in 2007 and 2013, with the entries Sorrow and Luottáš respectively. In 2019, she and her sister were back with a luvvt called Vuess. Since her win in 2001, she has not placed in the top 3 in the yoik category.

In addition to performing luvvts, Ageeva and her sister also collect and record them, ensuring that future generations will have access to them.

Written work
Ageeva has translated books and songs into her mother tongue of Kildin Sámi. For example, in 2021, she translated the traditional Victory Day song into Kildin Sámi with the title of Вуэјјтэм Пе̄ййв.

Publications

Editorial work
 2014 – Са̄мь-рӯшш са̄ннҍнэххьк / Саамско-Русский словарь by A. A. Antonova

Translations
 2007 – Вӣллькесь пуаз (translation of Ivan Yakovlevich Matryokhin's The White Reindeer, Russian: "Белый олень")
 2019 – Same: 100 mennesker i Sápmi/100 people in Sápmi/100 olbmo Sámis 
 2021 – Вуэјјтэм Пе̄ййв (from the Russian День Победы)

Discography

Compilation albums

 2001 – Sami Grand Prix 2001
 2003 – Sami Grand Prix 2003 together with Domna Khomyuk
 2005 – Davvi Jienat - Northern Voices
 2007 – Sami Grand Prix '07
 2013 – Sámi Grand Prix 2013
 2014 – Сборник саамских песен
 2015 – Сборник саамских сказок
 2017 – Богатырь Ляйне
 2019 – Sámi Grand Prix 2019 together with Domna Khomyuk

References

1952 births
Living people
Russian Sámi people
Sámi musicians
Russian Sámi-language writers
Kildin Sámi